Pokhara Valley is the second-largest valley in the hilly region of Nepal. It lies in the western part of Nepal. The cities of Pokhara and Lekhnath are in the valley. The city of Pokhara is one of the major cities of Nepal and it, like Kathmandu Valley, is extremely vulnerable to earthquakes due to its clay soil and liquefaction potential.

Tourism

Pokhara is one of the most popular tourist destinations in Nepal. Many tourists visit Pokhara Valley to see the Himalayan range and lakes. Pokhara is also famous for boating, trekking, rafting, paragliding, zipline and extreme sports like rafting, canoeing and bungee jumping. According to the Nepal Tourism Board, the number of international tourists to Pokhara in 2009 was 203,527, and the same year 509,956 international tourists visited Nepal and the number is increasing every year.

Lakes

Among many lakes in Pokhara Valley, Phewa Lake is the largest. Phewa Lake is also the second largest lake of Nepal and it includes the parts of Pokhara Valley, Sarangkot, and Kaskikot. The reflection of Mount Macchapucchre (Fishtail) can be seen on this lake. Many tourists come to enjoy boating and fishing on Phewa lake. Another main attraction of Phewa Lake is the two-storied temple of Barahi Bhagwati Temple, situated on the middle of the lake, like an island. In addition to Phewa Lake, Begnas lake is another famous lake in Pokhara Valley,  being the second largest lake in the Valley. Begnas Lake is situated at an elevation of 650 m and it covers 3 km2.

Extreme sports

Extreme sports also play a role in tourism. Recently, in Pokhara, the longest and fastest zip line in the world was built, which is 1850 m (6070 ft) long and it begins at the top of the Sarangkot hill and it ends near Yamdi river. The zip line can reach a maximum speed of 140 km/h (100 mph) and it has a vertical drop of almost 2000 feet. Riders can see views of 23000-foot Machhapuchhre mountain, Annapurna range and Seti river. Paragliding, which is also done from Sarangkot, is another extreme sport available in Pokhara Valley.

Annapurna Base Camp trekking, also known as ABC trekking, is another main attraction of Pokhara Valley. Trekking starts from Pokhara following Nayapul, Ghorepani, Tadapani, Sinuwa, Deurali and finally to Annapurna Base Camp which is at the height of 4090 m (13,418 ft). Many hotels and lodges are available throughout the journey. Visitors can enjoy the beautiful scenes of forests, hills, rhododendron (national flower), and many villages along the way. One study shows that ABC attracts about 25,000 visitors on the short trekking season, which is almost five times greater than Sagarmatha (Mt. Everest) National Park, which is the second most popular trekking destination of Nepal. ABC trekking has played a vital role in the economic status of people around this area, as well as, it is a milestone for the development of tourism industry in Nepal.

Caves 
Mahendra Cave is one of the most visited tourist attractions in Pokhara Valley. This cave is located in a small town called Batulechaur which is a ten-minute drive from the main city. The name Mahendra Cave is given after the Late King of Nepal Mahendra Bir Bikram Shah Dev. The cave is a natural tunnel where one can walk inside and see different kinds of rocks around the wall, such as limestone, which sparkles when light strikes it. As one of the darker sights in Nepal, Mahendra Cave gives visitors the opportunity to explore the darker territory inside the tunnel. Bat Cave, which is also known as the natural habitat of bats, is also worth of visiting, and it is located a ten-minute walk away from Mahendra Cave. Bat cave is 150 m long and 25 ft. high. The main entrance of this cave is quite narrow but the inner part is wide enough. The main specialty of this cave is that there are more than 15 thousand bats of different species. Images of elephant tusks, gods, and goddesses can be observed in the inner walls of the cave.

International Mountain Museum 

More than seventy thousand domestic and international tourists visit the International Mountain Museum (IMM) every year. IMM records, documents and exhibits the past and present developments related to mountain and mountaineering around the world. The museum contains three main exhibition halls: Hall of Great Himalayas, Hall of Fame and Hall of World Mountains. Inside the museum, there are exhibits on famous peaks, descriptions of famous mountaineers, the culture and lifestyle of mountain people, flora and fauna including geology, in an attempt to represent the traditional culture and values of the Nepalese people.

References

External links

 https://web.archive.org/web/20150217014939/http://www.pokharaphotogallery.com/ Pokhara valley photos

Valleys of Nepal
Kaski District
Geography of Pokhara